The Campfire Headphase is the third studio album by Boards of Canada. Released by Warp Records in October 2005, the album featured the addition of more organic musical elements, including heavily treated acoustic guitars and more conventional song structures. It received generally positive reviews from critics, and reached number 41 on the UK albums chart.

Background
The duo began recording sketches for the album as early as 2002, but did not work on the project in earnest until 2004. According to Michael Sandison, in comparison to their previous releases they aimed to "simultaneously shift and reduce the sound palette, making it more like a conventional band gone over the edge." This resulted in the presence of fewer samples, vocals, and cryptic references in favor of organic instrumentation. Regarding their process, Sandison stated that:

We usually imagine our music to have a visual element while we're writing it, so we were picturing this character losing his mind at the campfire and compressing weeks of events into a few hours, in that time-stretching way that acid fucks with your perception.

The duo avoided effects units and computer programming when possible, preferring to manipulate hardware sounds through direct modifications and EQing.

Release and reception

The track "Oscar See Through Red Eye" was released digitally on 5 September 2005 by Bleep.com, an online shop maintained by Warp Records. On 4 October 2005, the track "Dayvan Cowboy" was released through iTunes.

In April 2006, a music video for the song "Dayvan Cowboy" was released on the Warp Records website. The video consists of footage from Joe Kittinger's famous parachute jump from 19.5 miles' (31.4 km) altitude, and later slow-motion footage of big-wave surfer Laird Hamilton.  The video was directed by Melissa Olson.

The album received generally positive reviews, receiving a rating of 79 out of 100 on aggregate website Metacritic. Mark Richardson of Pitchfork noted that the group's use of guitars "makes explicit something about the band's sound that was always just beneath the surface: the connection of the music to the pastoral tradition of British folk," but noted that "the best thing Campfire Headphase has going is its unnamable synthesizer sounds," and concluded that its "blissed-out narcotic interludes don't come quite often enough, though, and in fact this feels like a step down from the last two albums."

Simon Reynolds of The Observer wrote that “blurring the boundaries between rock and techno is a smart move, because BoC have always made music that deserved to appeal beyond the electronic audience,” and praised “the stereophonic delirium of their production.” In December 2005, American webzine Somewhere Cold ranked The Campfire Headphase No. 2 on their 2005 Somewhere Cold Awards Hall of Fame list.

Track listing

Personnel
All personnel credits adapted from The Campfire Headphases liner notes.

Boards of Canada
Marcus Eoin – performer, producer
Mike Sandison – performer, producer

Design personnel
Boards of Canada – design
Natasha Morton – design

Charts

The album was awarded a silver certification from the Independent Music Companies Association which indicated sales of at least 30,000 copies throughout Europe.

References

External links
 The Campfire Headphase at the official Warp Records website
 "Dayvan Cowboy" music video (streaming)
 

Boards of Canada albums
Warp (record label) albums
2005 albums